The Ulúa River is a river in western Honduras. En route, it is joined by the Sulaco River, the Jicatuyo River, the Otoro River and the Chamelecón River. The Ulúa River valley is famed for its ornate calcite vessels that date from the Mayan times. One of them can be found in the British Museum's collection.

References

Rivers of Honduras
Geography of Mesoamerica